Bheemasena Nalamaharaja  is a 2020 Indian Kannada-language drama film directed by Karthik Saragur and produced by Pushkara Mallikarjunaiah, Rakshit Shetty, and Hemanth M. Rao. It stars Aravinnd Iyer and Arohi Narayan along with Priyanka, Aadya, and Achyut Kumar.

As per the director, the film is "based on six rasas -- sweet, sour, salty, bitter, pungent and astringent, and the six characters represent six rasas." The soundtrack and score was composed by Charan Raj and the cinematography was handled by Ravindranath.

Due to the COVID-19 pandemic, the film was streamed worldwide from 29 October 2020 on Amazon Prime Video as a part of their Great Indian Festival.

Cast
 Aravinnd Iyer as Latthesh / Bheemasena Nalamaharaja
 Arohi Narayan as Dr.Arohi/Vedavalli Varadarajan 
 Priyanka Thimmesh as Vedavalli Varadarajan / Sarah Mary
 Achyuth Kumar as Varadarajan Iyengar
 Vijay Chendoor as Kenda
 Lakshmi Karanth as Saraswathy Varadarajan
 Sandhya Arakere as Kavitha
 Aadya Udupi as Lalli 
 Amaan as Dr. Francis
 Pooja Kashyap as Veda's friend
 Chitrali Tejpal as Young Vedavalli
 Praveen Kumar Gasti as Worker at Nadimoola Resort
 Manas Gabriel as Aravind
 Deepa K N as Aravind's mother
 Meese Anjanappa as Hotel Owner
 Tushar Gowda as Young Latthesh
 Vinod Divakar as Father of church

Production
The film was officially launched on Varamahalakshmi festival day on 4 August 2017.

Accolades

References

External links
 
 
 

2020 films
2020s Kannada-language films
Indian drama films
Films shot in Bangalore
Films not released in theaters due to the COVID-19 pandemic
Amazon Prime Video original films
2020 drama films